Deadwood, a Western drama television series created by David Milch, premiered on the premium television channel HBO in the United States on March 21, 2004, and ended on August 27, 2006. The series consists of a total of 36 episodes over three 12-episode seasons; the episodes are approximately 55 minutes. A film continuation premiered on May 31, 2019.

Series overview

Episodes
Series creator and executive producer David Milch is explicitly credited with writing five of the show's 36 episodes; however, he did contribute significantly to the writing of almost every episode, frequently completely re-writing episode drafts written by other writers. The credited writer for any given episode is usually one of Milch's staff writers who helped him develop storylines.

Season 1 (2004)

Season 2 (2005)

Season 3 (2006)

Deadwood: The Movie (2019)

References

External links

Deadwood (TV series)
Lists of American drama television series episodes
Lists of American Western (genre) television series episodes